Leptobrachium hainanense, the Hainan pseudomoustache toad, is a species of amphibian in the family Megophryidae. It is endemic to the mountains of central and southwestern Hainan Island, China. Before being recognized as a separate species, it was confused with Leptobrachium hasseltii.

Leptobrachium hainanense is an uncommon species inhabiting evergreen broadleaf forests and breeding in hill streams. It is threatened by habitat loss and degradation, and is also locally collected for food.

References 

hainanense
Amphibians of China
Endemic fauna of Hainan
Amphibians described in 1993
Taxonomy articles created by Polbot